Hebei Xuechi (Simplified Chinese: 河北雪驰) is a semi-professional Chinese football club, based in Baoding, Hebei Province.

History
The club was originally founded as a nondescript amateur club named Qingdao Zhongneng (not to be confused with the professional football club Qingdao Zhongneng, which was named Qingdao Etsong Hainiu at that time, prior to Jonoon Group's takeover of that club in 2004) in Qingdao, Shandong Province in 2003, and changed its name to Qingdao Changqing in 2004. In 2005, their name was changed again, to Qingdao Shark. In the same year, they were crowned champions of Qingdao City Football League, then participated in the North series of China Amateur Football League, and was ranked 2nd.

In 2006, the club enrolled in China League Two, and appointed former Chinese national team player Li Qiang as manager. In the middle of the season, the club moved to Baoding, Hebei Province and renamed itself Hebei Xuechi. At the end of the regular season, the team finished fourth out of the nine clubs in North division and secured a play-off spot, but lost to Anhui Jiufang in the quarter-finals. The club was dissolved afterwards.

Name history
Qingdao Zhongneng F.C. 青岛中能 2003
Qingdao Changqing F.C. 青岛长青 2004
Qingdao Shark F.C. 青岛海鲨 2005–2006
Hebei Xuechi F.C. 河北雪驰 2006

Honors
Qingdao City Football League
Winners: 2005

External links
 https://web.archive.org/web/20070929095048/http://www.haishafc.com/

Defunct football clubs in China
Football clubs in China
Sport in Qingdao
2003 establishments in China
2006 disestablishments in China